Dendrobium mirbelianum, commonly known as the dark-stemmed antler orchid or mangrove orchid, is an epiphytic or lithophytic orchid in the family Orchidaceae. It has cylindrical, dark-coloured pseudobulbs with leathery, dark green leaves and up to twelve pale to dark brown flowers with a yellow labellum with dark red veins. This antler orchid occurs in northern Australia, New Guinea and Indonesia.

Description
The side lobes curve upwards and the middle lobe has wavy edges and three ridges along its midline. Flowering occurs mainly from August to November but sporadically in other months. Some plants have widely opening flowers and are insect pollinated while others are self-pollinated and open slowly or not at all.

Taxonomy and naming
Dendrobium mirbelianum was first formally described in 1829 by Charles Gaudichaud-Beaupré in his Voyage Autour du Monde ... sur les Corvettes de S.M. l'Uranie et la Physicienne. The specific epithet (mirbelianum) honours the French botanist and politician Charles-François Brisseau de Mirbel.

Distribution and habitat
The dark-stemmed antler orchid grows in trees, especially mangroves, in coastal swamps and sometimes on rocks. It occurs on the Maluku Island in Indonesia, in New Guinea including the Bismark Archipelago, the Solomon Islands and on Moa Island and between the Daintree and Innisfail in Queensland.

Conservation
This orchid is classed as "endangered" under the Australian Government Environment Protection and Biodiversity Conservation Act 1999 and under the Queensland Government Nature Conservation Act 1992. The main threat to the species is land clearing for agriculture.

References

mirbelianum
Orchids of Indonesia
Orchids of New Guinea
Orchids of Queensland
Plants described in 1829
Taxa named by Charles Gaudichaud-Beaupré